Kyriakos Tavoularis was a Greek army officer.

Life
Kyriakos Tavoularis was born on 18 January 1880 at Karya, near Oitylo in Laconia. He joined the Hellenic Army as a volunteer on 1 January 1898. In April 1906 he went to then Ottoman-ruled Macedonia to participate in the Macedonian Struggle. He remained in Macedonia until July 1909.

During the Balkan Wars of 1912–13, he commanded artillery batteries and fought in most battles of the two conflicts. In 1918 he was commanding an artillery battalion in the Crete Division in the Macedonian front  and fought in the Vardar offensive. During the Greco-Turkish War of 1919–1922, he served as head of artillery for the 5th Infantry Division (the renamed Crete Division), and finally as military commandant of Bandirma.

After the war he served as senior artillery commander and divisional commander, until his retirement on 10 October 1929 with the rank of major general.

References

1880 births
20th-century deaths
Year of death unknown
Greek military personnel of the Balkan Wars
Greek military personnel of the Greco-Turkish War (1919–1922)
Greek military personnel of the Macedonian Struggle
Greek military personnel of World War I
Hellenic Army major generals
People from Laconia